Eleonora "Nora" Hiltl (born 21 June 1905, Vienna2 January 1979, Vienna) was a Viennese Austrian People's Party politician. Before that she had been an educator imprisoned during the Nazi period. After the war she was active on women's issues and received the Benemerenti medal for her Catholic work. Her sister Herta Pammer headed a Catholic women's organization in Austria.

References 

Politicians from Vienna
Austrian People's Party politicians
Austrian Roman Catholics
Recipients of the Benemerenti medal
Austrian women in politics
Austrian educators
Austrian women educators
1905 births
1979 deaths